Entoconcha mirabilis is a species of very small parasitic sea snail, a marine gastropod mollusk in the family Eulimidae. This species is the only one known to exist within the genus, Entoconcha. The species is parasitic on holothuroidea, sea cucumbers. As an adult it resembles a worm and has no shell.

Distribution
This species occurs in the following locations:

European waters (ERMS scope)

References

External links

Eulimidae
Gastropods described in 1852